Borvo or Bormo (Gaulish: *Borwō, Bormō) was an ancient Celtic god of healing springs worshipped in Gauls and Gallaecia. He was sometimes identified with the Graeco-Roman god Apollo, although his cult had preserved a high degree of autonomy during the Roman period.

Name 

The Gaulish theonym Boruō means 'hot spring', 'warm source'. It stems from the Proto-Celtic verbal root *berw- ('boil, brew'; cf. Old Irish berbaid, Middle Welsh berwi), itself from Proto-Indo-European *bʰerw- ('boil, brew'; cf. Latin ferueō 'to be intensely hot, boil', Sanskrit bhurváni 'agitated, wild'). The Bhearú river (River Barrow) in Ireland has also been linked to this Celtic root. An apophonic variant *bʰreh₁w- gave rise to various Indo-European words for 'source, spring', including the Greek phréar (φρέαρ), Armenian ałbiwr, Germanic *brunnōn, and Latin Furrina (*Frūrina).

The variant Bormō could have emerged from lenition, a difference in suffixes, or from dissimilation. Known derivates include Bormanicus (Caldas de Vizela), from an earlier *Borwānicos, and Bormanus or Borbanus (Aix-en-Diois, Aix-en-Provence), from an earlier *Borwānos. A goddess named Boruoboendoa, perhaps reflecting the Gaulish theonym *Buruo-bouinduā or *Buruo-bō-uinduā, has also been found in Utrecht.

The toponyms Bourbon-l'Archambault, Bourbon-Lancy, Bourbonne-les-Bains, Boulbon, Bormes, Bourbriac, La Bourboule and Worms are derived from Borvo or from its variant Bormo. The names of various small rivers in France, such as Bourbouillon, Bourban, and Bourbière, also stem from the theonym.

Centres of worship

In Gaul, he was particularly worshipped at Bourbonne-les-Bains, in the territory of the Lingones, where ten inscriptions are recorded. Two other inscriptions are recorded, one (CIL 13, 02901) from Entrains-sur-Nohain and the other (CIL 12, 02443) from  Aix-en-Savoie in Gallia Narbonensis. Votive tablets inscribed ‘Borvo’ show that the offerers desired healing for themselves or others. Many of the sites where offerings to Borvo have been found are in Gaul: inscriptions to him have been found in Drôme at Aix-en-Diois, Bouches-du-Rhône at Aix-en-Provence, Gers at Auch, Allier at Bourbon-l'Archambault, Savoie at Aix-les-Bains, Saône-et-Loire at Bourbon-Lancy, in Savoie at Aix-les-Bains, Haute-Marne at Bourbonne-les-Bains and in Nièvre at Entrains-sur-Nohain. 

Findings have also been uncovered in the Netherlands at Utrecht, where he is called Boruoboendua Vabusoa Labbonus, and in Portugal at Vizela and at Idanha-a-Velha, where he is called Borus and identified with Mars. At Aix-en-Provence, he was referred to as Borbanus and Bormanus but at Vizela in Portugal, he was hailed as Bormanicus, and at Burtscheid and at Worms in Germany as Borbetomagus.

Divine entourage
Borvo was frequently associated with a divine consort, usually Damona (Bourbonne, Bourbon-Lancy), but sometimes also Bormana when he was worshipped by the name Bormanus (Die,  Aix-en-Diois). Bormana was in some areas worshipped independently of her male counterpart, such as at Saint-Vulbas.Borvo bore similarities to the goddess Sirona, who was also a healing deity associated with mineral springs. According to some scholars, Sirona may have been his mother.

In other areas, Borvo's partner is the goddess Bormana. Bormana was, in some areas, worshipped independently of her male counterpart. Gods like Borvo, and others, equated with Apollo, presided over healing springs, and they are usually associated with goddesses, as their husbands or sons. He is found in Drôme at Aix-en-Diois with Bormana and in Saône-et-Loire at Bourbon-Lancy and in Haute-Marne at Bourbonne-les-Bains with Damona but he is accompanied by the ‘candid spirit’ Candidus in Nièvre at Entrains-sur-Nohain. In the Netherlands at Utrecht as Boruoboendua Vabusoa Lobbonus, he is found in the company of a Celtic Hercules, Macusanus and Baldruus.

References

Bibliography

 

Gaulish gods
Health gods
Water gods
Lusitanian gods
Gallaecian gods